Oruzodes is a genus of moths of the family Noctuidae. The genus was described by Warren in 1913.

Species
Oruzodes flavilunata Warren, 1913
Oruzodes unipunctata Bethune-Baker, 1906

References

Acontiinae